George Hill (born 1844) was a sailor serving in the United States Navy who received the Medal of Honor for bravery.

Biography
Hill was born 1844 in England and after immigrating to the United States he joined the navy. For his actions received the Medal of Honor July 9, 1872.

Medal of Honor citation
Rank and organization: Chief Quarter Gunner, U.S. Navy. Born: 1844, England. Entered service at: New York, N.Y. G.O. No.: 176, 9 July 1872.

Citation:

Serving on board the U.S.S. Kansas, Hill displayed great coolness and self-possession at the time Comdr. A. F. Crosman and others were drowned, near Greytown, Nicaragua, 12 April 1872, and by extraordinary heroism and personal exertion, prevented greater loss of life.

See also

List of Medal of Honor recipients in non-combat incidents

References

External links

1844 births
Year of death missing
United States Navy Medal of Honor recipients
United States Navy sailors
Military personnel from New York City
English-born Medal of Honor recipients
English emigrants to the United States
Non-combat recipients of the Medal of Honor